The 1999 Copa CONMEBOL was the eighth edition of CONMEBOL's annual club tournament. Teams that failed to qualify for the Copa Libertadores played in this tournament. Fourteen teams from nine South American football confederations (Uruguay sent no representatives) qualified for this tournament.  Talleres defeated CSA in the finals.

Qualified teams

Bracket

First round

|}

Quarter finals

|}

Semi finals

|}

Finals

|}

External links
CONMEBOL 1999 at RSSSF

Copa CONMEBOL
3